Chromosome 19 open reading frame 44 is a protein that in humans is encoded by the C19orf44 gene.
 C19orf44 is an uncharacterized protein with an unknown function in humans. C19orf44 is non-limiting implying that the protein (and gene) exists in other species besides human. The protein contains one domain of unknown function (DUF) that is highly conserved throughout its orthologs. This protein is most highly expressed in the testis and ovary, but also has significant expression in the thyroid and parathyroid. Other names for this protein include: LOC84167.

Gene 
The entire gene is 25,416 base pairs in length, and has an unprocessed mRNA that is 3,446 nucleotides in length. It contains 10 exons that code for a 657 amino acid protein. There are 7 splice variants that exist for C19orf44.

Locus 

C19orf44 is located on the nineteenth chromosome on 19p13.11.

Protein

Primary Sequence 

C19orf44 has a molecular weight of 71,343 Da, and an isoelectric point of 5.52. The amino acid sequence for C19orf44 was found to be serine rich using tools on EMBL-EBI. Additionally, there is a domain of unknown function (DUF) located from amino acid 474 to 641.

Post-translational modifications 

C19orf44 has experimentally determined phosphorylation sites at the S114 and S213 positions. Other predicted post-translational modifications were found using tools on ExPASy and are shown in the protein illustration below. N-terminal acetylation is predicted at S3. There is also a predicted sumoylation motif from amino acid 212 to 221.

Localization 
C19orf44 is predicted to be localized in the nucleus or cytosol.

Expression 
C19orf44 is shown to be expressed at low levels in various tissues throughout the body as shown by NCBI's EST Profile. It most highly expressed in the testis and ovary, but also has significant expression in the thyroid and parathyroid. C19orf44 is expressed in all stages of development, except for in infants. There is an increased expression of C19orf44 in a developing fetus.

Homology and Evolution

Orthologs 
Orthologs of C19orf44 have been found in most mammals and a select few other vertebrates and invertebrates. Multiple sequence alignments using ClustalW provided evidence that the DUF in C19orf44 is highly conserved in its orthologs. The table below represents a small selection of the orthologs found using NCBI Blast.

Paralogs 
There are no paralogs for C19orf44 in Homo sapiens.

Interacting Proteins 
C19orf44 has been found to interact with various proteins from the two-hybrid screening method. Interactions with Hsp90 co-chaperone (CDC37), and spermatid associated protein (SPERT) have been found.

References